Oleh Stepanovych Bilyk (born 11 January 1998) is a Ukrainian professional footballer who plays as a goalkeeper for Inhulets Petrove in the Ukrainian Premier League.

Career 
Bilyk is a product of Youth Sportive School from his native Pidvolochysk in Ternopil Oblast, FC Ternopil and Skala Stryi Sportive Systems. In July 2016 he was promoted to the Skala main squad to compete in the Ukrainian First League.

He made his debut for FC Skala in a game against FC Poltava on 30 October 2016 in the Ukrainian First League.

In February 2019 Bilyk signed a contract with the Ukrainian Premier League FC Oleksandriya.

In January 2023 he moved to Inhulets Petrove.

References

External links 
 
 

1998 births
Living people
People from Pidvolochysk
Ukrainian footballers
Association football goalkeepers
FC Skala Stryi (2004) players
FC Oleksandriya players
FC Inhulets Petrove players
Ukrainian Premier League players
Ukrainian First League players
Ukrainian Second League players
Sportspeople from Ternopil Oblast